Coral Reefs is a quarterly peer-reviewed scientific journal dedicated to the study of coral reefs. It was established in 1982 and is published by Springer Science+Business Media on behalf of the International Society for Reef Studies, of which it is the official journal. This journal also acts as the International Coral Reef Society. The editor-in-chief is Morgan Pratchett (James Cook University). They have published multiple in-depth articles covering coral reef topics such as conservation of coral reef fishes and different approaches that capture the complexity of coral reefs when examining canopy-forming organisms. According to the Journal Citation Reports, the journal has a 2017 impact factor of 3.095. According to Springer  the journal has a 2020 impact factor of 3.902, five year impact factor of 3.880, and as of 2021 has 454,744 downloads.

Volume 41, issue 2, April 2022 contains 20 articles covering a range of topics many of which are accessible without an account while still containing large amounts of detailed information. This issue covers topics including a study of coral in the Red Sea and its thermal thresholds which can then be examined to expect negative outcomes of shifting climate. Another article within this issue included an examination of complex coral reefs and how this effects the corallivorous sea star in the Maldives. This issue contains many more articles all of which show a similar level of depth and understanding of the topics being discussed.

References

External links

International Coral Reef Society

Ecology journals
Coral reefs
Springer Science+Business Media academic journals
English-language journals
Publications established in 1982
Academic journals associated with international learned and professional societies
Quarterly journals